Angiomatoid fibrous histiocytoma (AFH) is a rare soft tissue cancer that affects children and young adults. On November 16, 2020, US MasterChef Junior participant Ben Watkins died from the disease at the age of 14.

Pathology
It is characterized by cystic blood-filled spaces and composed of histiocyte-like cells.  A lymphocytic cuff is common.  It often simulates a vascular lesion, and was initially described as doing this.

AFH typically has a chromosomal translocation involving the ATF1 gene -- t(12;16) FUS/ATF1 or t(12;22) EWS/ATF1.

Diagnosis

Treatment

See also
 Granulomatous inflammation
 Vascular tumor

References

External links 

Soft tissue disorders